Schönbeck is a surname. Notable people with the surname include:

Christoph Andreas Johann Szembek or Schönbeck (1680–1740), Bishop of Ermland 1724-1740
Florian Schönbeck (born 1974), German decathlete
Jan Szembek or Schönbeck (died 1731), Deputy Chancellor of the Polish Crown
Jan Szembek (diplomat) or Schönbeck, diplomat of the Second Polish Republic 
Rudolf Schönbeck (born 1919), German football player

German-language surnames